Qalatuiyeh-ye Tang-e Salehi (also Romanized as Qalātū’īyeh-ye Tang-e Şāleḥī; also known as Faleh Tū’īd, Qalātū, and Qalātū’īyeh) is a village in Dar Agah Rural District, in the Central District of Hajjiabad County, Hormozgan Province, Iran. At the 2006 census, its population was 40, in 9 families.

References 

Populated places in Hajjiabad County